Lassie is a fictional female Rough Collie dog and is featured in a short story by Eric Knight that was later expanded to a full-length novel called Lassie Come-Home. Knight's portrayal of Lassie bears some features in common with another fictional female collie of the same name, featured in the British writer Elizabeth Gaskell's 1859 short story "The Half Brothers". In "The Half Brothers", Lassie is loved only by her young master and guides the adults back to where two boys are lost in a snowstorm.

Published in 1940, Knight's novel was filmed by Metro-Goldwyn-Mayer in 1943 as Lassie Come Home, with a dog named Pal playing Lassie. Pal then appeared with the stage name "Lassie" in six other MGM feature films through 1951. Pal's owner and trainer, Rudd Weatherwax, then acquired the Lassie name and trademark from MGM and appeared with Pal (as "Lassie") at rodeos, fairs, and similar events across America in the early 1950s. In 1954, the long-running Emmy-winning television series Lassie debuted and, over the next 19 years, a succession of Pal's descendants appeared on the series. The "Lassie" character has appeared in radio, television, film, toys, comic books, animated series, juvenile novels, and other media. Pal's descendants continue to play Lassie today.

History

Elizabeth Gaskell short story
An early depiction of Lassie is found in British writer Elizabeth Gaskell's 1859 short story "The Half-brothers".  In the story, Lassie is described as a female collie with "intelligent, apprehensive eyes" who rescues two half-brothers who are lost and dying in the snow.  When the younger brother can no longer carry on, elder brother Gregory, Lassie's master, ties a handkerchief around Lassie's neck and sends her home.  Lassie arrives home, and leads the search party to the boys.  When they arrive Gregory is dead, but his younger half-brother is saved.  Thus, Gaskell apparently originated the character Lassie and, at the same time, defined the "Lassie saves the day" storyline that is the essence of subsequent Lassie tales.

World War I incident
According to writer Nigel Clarke in the "Shipwreck Guide to Dorset and South Devon", the original Lassie that inspired so many films and television episodes was a rough-haired crossbreed who saved the life of a sailor during World War I.

Half collie, Lassie was owned by the landlord of the Pilot Boat, a pub in the port of Lyme Regis. On New Year's Day in 1915 the Royal Navy battleship  was torpedoed by a German submarine off Start Point in South Devon, with the loss of more than 500 men. In a storm that followed the accident, a life raft containing bodies was blown along the coast to Lyme Regis. In helping to deal with the crisis, the local pub in Lyme Regis, called the Pilot Boat, offered its cellar as a mortuary.

When the bodies had been laid out on the stone floor, Lassie, a crossbred collie owned by the pub owner, found her way down amongst the bodies, and she began to lick the face of one of the victims, Able Seaman John Cowan. She stayed beside him for more than half an hour, nuzzling him and keeping him warm with her fur. To everyone's astonishment, Cowan eventually stirred. He was taken to hospital and went on to make a full recovery. He visited Lassie again when he returned to thank all who saved his life.

When the officers heard the story of Lassie and what she did to rescue Cowan, they told it again and again to any reporter who would listen as it was inspirational and heart-warming. Hollywood got hold of the story, and so a star was born.

Eric Knight short story and novel
The fictional character of Lassie was created by English author Eric Knight in Lassie Come-Home, first published as a short story in The Saturday Evening Post in 1938 and later as a full-length novel in 1940. Set in the Depression-era England, the novel depicts the lengthy journey a rough collie makes to be reunited with her young Yorkshire master after her family is forced to sell her for money.

Movies and television
In 1943, the novel was adapted into a feature film, Lassie Come Home, by Metro-Goldwyn-Mayer (MGM) that starred Roddy McDowall and Elizabeth Taylor.  The movie was a hit and enjoyed favorable critical response.  MGM followed this with several additional films, including a sequel entitled Son of Lassie (1945), starring Peter Lawford and June Lockhart, and Courage of Lassie with Elizabeth Taylor. A radio series, Lassie Radio Show, was also created, airing until 1949.

Between 1954-1973, the television series Lassie was broadcast, with Lassie initially residing on a farm with a young male master. In the eleventh season, it changed to U.S. Forest Service rangers as her companions, then the collie was on her own for a season before ending the series with Lassie residing at a ranch for orphaned children. The long-running series was the recipient of two Emmy Awards before it was canceled in 1973.  Lassie won several PATSY Awards (an award for animal actors). A second series followed in the 1980s. In 1997, Canadian production company Cinar Inc. produced a new Lassie television series for the Animal Planet network in the U.S. and YTV in Canada. It ran until 1999.

In 2005, a remake of the original Lassie Come Home movie was produced in the United Kingdom. Starring Peter O'Toole and Samantha Morton, Lassie was released in 2006.

Lassie continues to make personal appearances as well as marketing a line of pet food and a current pet care TV show, Lassie's Pet Vet on PBS stations in the United States. Lassie is one of only four animals (and one of very few fictional characters, such as Mickey Mouse, Kermit the Frog,  and Bugs Bunny) to be awarded a star on the Hollywood Walk of Fame—the others being silent-film stars Rin Tin Tin, Uggie and Strongheart. In 2005, the show business journal Variety named Lassie one of the "100 Icons of the Century"—the only animal star on the list.

An animated TV series was made based on the dog. It was called "The New Adventures of Lassie". In this animated TV series Lassie was a dog that was owned by the Parker family in a national park. The animated TV series is mainly a traditionally animated (2D hand-drawn animated) TV series with some CGI animation (vehicles) in it. The TV series was shown on TVOntario in Ontario, Canada, from 2013 to 2016. 
Lassie was an animated TV series entitled: "Lassie's Rescue Rangers" created by  Filmation Associates
TV-G | 30min | Animation, Adventure, Family | TV series (1973–1975).

Media

Art
Lassie is featured in Our Nation's 200th Birthday, The Telephone's 100th Birthday (1976) by Stanley Meltzoff for Bell System.

Films

List of films

Box office performance

Radio

Television

Video games

Books
 Lassie Come-Home
 Lassie: The Prize
 Forest Ranger Handbook
 Lassie: A Boy's Best Friend & Buried Treasure
 Lassie: Party Nightmare & Water Watchdog
 Lassie: Skateboard Stunt & Danger Zone

 Seafarer Books 
 Lassie and the Lost Little Sheep
 Lassie's Forest Adventure

 Whitman Cozy-Corner 
 Lassie: Rescue in the Storm

 Whitman Novels 
 Lassie and the Mystery of Blackberry Bog
 Lassie and the Secret of the Summer
 Lassie: Forbidden Valley
 Lassie: Treasure Hunter by Charles S. Strong
 Lassie: the Wild Mountain Trail
 Lassie and the Mystery of Bristlecone Pine
 Lassie and the Secret of the Smelter's Cave
 Lassie: Lost in the Snow
 Lassie: Trouble at Panter's Lake

 Big Little Books 
 Lassie: Adventure in Alaska
 Lassie and the Shabby Sheik
 Lassie: Old One Eye Golden Books  
 The Adventures of Lassie
 Lassie and Her Day in the Sun
 Lassie and Her Friends
 Lassie and the Big Clean-Up Day
 Lassie and the Daring Rescue
 Lassie and the Lost Explorer
 Lassie Shows the Way
 Lassie: The Great Escape

 Tell-a-Tale Books 
 Hooray for Lassie!
 Lassie and the Cub Scout
 Lassie and the Deer Mystery
 Lassie and the Firefighters
 Lassie and the Kittens
 Lassie Finds a Friend
 Lassie's Brave Adventure
 Lassie: The Busy Morning

 Tip-Top Books 
 Lassie: The Sandbar Rescue

 Wonder Books 
 Lassie's Long Trip

 Marian Bray 
 Lassie to the Rescue
 Lassie: Hayloft Hideout
 Lassie Under the Big Top
 Lassie: Treasure at Eagle Mountain
 Lassie: Danger at Echo Cliffs

 The New Lassie 
 The Puppy Problem
 Digging Up Danger
 The Big Blowup
 Water Watchdog
 Skateboard Dare
 Dangerous Party

See also
 Rough Collie
 Bessy, a Belgian comic strip inspired by the success of "Lassie" and which also featured a collie. 
 John English
 Rin Tin Tin

References

External links
 

 
Fictional dogs
Dog actors
Characters in American novels of the 20th century
Drama television characters
Literary characters introduced in 1940
American film series
Film series introduced in 1943
Mass media franchises